Tomales Bay Oyster Company (also called TBOC) is an oyster farm in Marshall, California in the United States. It is located on California State Route 1  and is the oldest continuously run oyster farm in California.

History
TBOC was founded in 1909, making it the oldest continuously ran oyster farm in California.
TBOC is co-owned by Tod Friend. Drew Alden is the proprietor. TBOC serves five types of Pacific oysters and customers must shuck their own oysters. 

They were in litigation with the California Coastal Commission regarding the farm's popularity, which the state says has increased beyond the capacity of its original permit allowance. The original permit, acquired in 1987, allows for Friday through Sunday retail sales and only eight employees. Starting in 2012, TBOC was providing retail sales seven days a week and had over eight employees.

The farm has so many visitors that the parking lot often overflows onto Highway One, causing traffic congestion. The parking has been described as "chaotic" by the North Bay Bohemian.

References

External links

Oysters
Oyster bars in the United States
West Marin
Food and drink companies based in California
Restaurants in the San Francisco Bay Area
Companies based in Marin County, California
American companies established in 1909
Food and drink companies established in 1909
1909 establishments in California
Food and drink in the San Francisco Bay Area
Aquaculture in the United States